Steve Baxter was an American songwriter and guitarist, best known as one of the founding members of the rock group Daniel Amos. He died on 9 September 2020.

References 

Year of birth missing (living people)
American rock guitarists
American male guitarists
American male songwriters
Daniel Amos members